Avenue is an underground light rail transit (LRT) station under construction on Line 5 Eglinton, a new line that is part of the Toronto subway system. The station is located in North Toronto on Eglinton Avenue between Avenue Road and Highbourne Road. It is the deepest underground station on the line. Destinations include the Chaplin Estates neighbourhood, Marshall McLuhan Catholic Secondary School, the Eglinton Theatre, and Eglinton Park. The station is scheduled to open in 2023.

Retail spaces will be available at both entrances at street level. The station will have on-street connections to TTC buses and outdoor parking for 50 bicycles. There is a third centre track on the east side of the station between the eastbound and westbound tracks either to store a train or to allow a train to change direction due to an emergency or a change in service.

Avenue station was one of four underground stations that was "mined" (built using the sequential excavation method) rather than being built using the cut-and-cover method like most of the other underground stations. Both the station platform and the centre-track structure are part of a single circular tube, and there are no support columns between the three tracks. Shops were demolished to construct the two station entrances.

In a report to the TTC Board on November 23, 2015, it was recommended that stations on Line 5 Eglinton should be given unique names. Metrolinx initially proposed that the station be named "Avenue", for Avenue Road. Later, Metrolinx changed the proposed name to "Oriole Park". However, by January 2016, the proposed station name had been changed back to "Avenue" because "Oriole Park" was too similar to the name of another transit station within Toronto, namely Oriole GO Station on GO Transit's Richmond Hill line.

Surface connections 

, the following are the proposed connecting routes that would serve this station when Line 5 Eglinton opens:

References

External links
Avenue Station project page at the Eglinton Crosstown website.
 published by CrosstownTO on June 11, 2020

Line 5 Eglinton stations